Mingshan may refer to the following locations in China:

Mingshan District, Ya'an (名山区), formerly Mingshan County, Sichuan
Mingshan District, Benxi (明山区), Liaoning
Mingshan, Luobei County (名山镇), town in Heilongjiang
Mingshan Subdistrict (名山街道)
Mingshan Subdistrict, Fengdu County, Chongqing
Mingshan Subdistrict, Yulin, Guangxi, Yuzhou Mingshan District, Yulin, Guangxi
Mingshan Subdistrict, Benxi, in Mingshan District, Liaoning